Jan Gehl  Hon. FAIA (born 17 September 1936, Copenhagen) is a Danish architect and urban design consultant based in Copenhagen whose career has focused on improving the quality of urban life by re-orienting city design towards the pedestrian and cyclist. He is a founding partner of Gehl Architects.

Biography
Gehl received a Masters of Architecture from the School of Architecture at the Royal Danish Academy of Fine Arts (KADK) in Copenhagen in 1960, and practiced architecture from 1960 to 1966. In 1966 he received a research grant from KADK to study " the form and use of public spaces"; his book Life between Buildings (1971) reports his studies of public life in public spaces, and develops his theories about how city planning and architecture influence public life. He became a professor of urban planning at KADK, and a visiting professor around the world. He co-founded Gehl Architects in 2000 with Helle Søholt, held a Partner position until 2011, and remains a Senior Advisor.

As a "young architect working in the suburbs," Gehl married a psychologist and "had many discussions about why the human side of architecture was not more carefully looked after by the architects, landscape architects, and planners... My wife and I set out to study the borderland between sociology, psychology, architecture, and planning."

Influence

Gehl first published his influential Life Between Buildings in Danish in 1971, with the first English translation published in 1987.  Gehl advocates a sensible, straightforward approach to improving urban form:  systematically documenting urban spaces, making gradual incremental improvements, then documenting them again. In 2012 the book is translated into a film by the same name, exhibited in a 24 meters curved room at the "New Nordic Architecture" exhibition Louisiana Museum of Modern Art and later at the Venice Biennale for Architecture.

Gehl's book Public Spaces, Public Life describes how such incremental improvements have transformed Copenhagen from a car-dominated city to a pedestrian-oriented city over 40 years.  Copenhagen's Strøget carfree zone, one of the longest pedestrian shopping areas in Europe, is primarily the result of Gehl's work.

Gehl participates in and advises many urban design and public projects around the world:
 In 2004 he carried out an important study in to the quality of the public realm in London, commissioned by Central London Partnership and Transport for London, and supported City of Wakefield and the town of Castleford in developing and delivering better public spaces, as part of an initiative known as "The Castleford Project".
 In 2007–08 he was hired by New York City's Department of Transportation to re-imagine New York City streets by introducing designs to improve life for pedestrians and cyclists. The DOT used Gehl's work to "directly inform" the implementation of their new urban planning and design policies and projects.
 Gehl has been influential in Australia and New Zealand as well, where he prepared Public Life studies for the city centres of Melbourne (1994 and 2004), Perth (1995 and 2009), Adelaide (2002) Sydney (2007), Auckland (2008), Wellington (2004), Christchurch, Launceston and Hobart (2010)

Gehl credits the "grandmother of humanistic planning" Jane Jacobs for drawing his attention to the importance of human scale. “Fifty years ago she said – go out there and see what works and what doesn’t work, and learn from reality. Look out of your windows, spend time in the streets and squares and see how people actually use spaces, learn from that, and use it.”

Awards and distinctions
 1992 Honorary Doctorate from Heriot-Watt University
 1993 Sir Patrick Abercrombie Prize – for exemplary contributions to Town Planning and Territorial Development, International Union of Architects
 1998 EDRA Award, Environmental Design Research Association, USA
 2007 Honorary Academician, The Academy of Urbanism, UK
 2008 Landscape Institute Award, Landscape Institute, UK
 2008 Honorary Fellow of American Institute of Architects
 2009 NYC Award, New York City, USA
 2009 Civic Trust Award for Brighton New Road Civic Trust, UK
 2011 Prince Eugen Medal for outstanding artistic achievement in architecture, Denmark 
 2013 C.F. Hansen Medal
 Design Futures Council Senior Fellow
2015 Global Award for Sustainable Architecture
2018 Athena Medal, Congress for the New Urbanism

Selected publications
 Gehl, J (1987) Life Between Buildings: Using Public Space, translated by Jo Koch, Van Nostrand Reinhold, New York.
 Gehl, J. and Gemzøe, L. (2000) New City Spaces, The Danish Architectural Press. Copenhagen.
 Gehl, J. and Gemzøe, L. (2004) Public Spaces, Public Life, Danish Architectural Press.
 Gehl, J. et al. (2006) New City Life, The Danish Architectural Press, Denmark.
 Gehl, J. (2010) Cities for People, Island Press.
 Gehl, J. and Svarre, B. (2013) How to Study Public Life, Island Press

See also
Public space
New Urbanism
Transit-oriented development

References

External links
  Gehl Architects, Copenhagen
  Complete text of "Life Between Buildings" Chapter 1 in English
 The Castleford Project, an innovative urban revitalization program in Yorkshire, UK
  Metropolis Magazine 10-step program for pedestrianizing Copenhagen
 Streetsblog.org report: "Jan Gehl: Gridlocked Streets Are “Not a Law of Nature” 
 The Royal Institute of British Architects, International Dialogues: Architecture and Climate Change talk presented by Jan Gehl(video)
 Jan Gehl interview from ArchDaily
 Assemble Papers profile: "Jan Gehl: Cities for People"
 "The Human Scale" (2012), a documentary on the work of Gehl Architects, by director Andreas Møl Dalsgaard
 An interview with Jan Gehl on Notebook on Cities and Culture

1936 births
Living people
Architects from Copenhagen
20th-century Danish architects
21st-century Danish architects
Danish urban planners
Danish company founders
Royal Danish Academy of Fine Arts alumni
Honorary Fellows of the American Institute of Architects
Cycling advocates
Recipients of the Prince Eugen Medal
Recipients of the C.F. Hansen Medal
Sustainable transport pioneers
Urban theorists